The Belarus Harness Horse, is a Belarusian breed of draught horse. It was bred for use in agriculture, and is also used to produce mare's milk and horsemeat.

History 

The Belorusskaya was bred in the late nineteenth and early twentieth centuries, principally in the western part of what is now Belarus, which was for much of the twentieth century the Byelorussian Soviet Socialist Republic. The aim was to create an agricultural draught horse adapted to local conditions, capable of working on sandy, swampy or woodland terrain. Local mares, many of them of Polesian type, were put to imported stallions. The majority of these were of the Norwegian Dølehest draught breed, but there was also some Ardennes and Brabant influence. By the 1980s the breeding programme was close to completion; two volumes of the stud-book had been issued, in which 616 mares and 135 stallions were recorded. 

In 1980 the total breed population was some 93000, of which almost 28000 were pure-bred.

The breed was officially recognised in Belarus in 2000.

Characteristics

Use

References 

Horse breeds
Horse breeds originating in Belarus